The 1992 Chatham Cup was the 65th annual nationwide knockout football competition in New Zealand.

Up to the last 16 of the competition, the cup was run in three regions (northern, central, and southern), with an open draw from the quarter-finals on. National League teams received a bye until the third round (last 64). In all, 141 teams took part in the competition.

The 1992 final
In the final, Darren Fellows put Waikato United into the lead early on, but Miramar Rangers fought back with goal before half time to Billy Wright. Wright added a second via a penalty in the second half, followed by a late goal from Vaughan Coveny.

The Jack Batty Memorial Cup is awarded to the player adjudged to have made to most positive impact in the Chatham Cup final. The winner of the 1992 Jack Batty Memorial Cup was Neal Cave of Miramar Rangers.

Results

Third Round

* Won on penalties by Mt. Roskill (4-3), Manurewa (7-6), and Western (6-5)

Fourth Round

* Won on penalties by Christchurch United (4-2), Red Sox (4-2), and Western Suburbs (8-7)

Fifth Round

* North Shore United won 4–3 on penalties.

Sixth Round

* North Shore United won 5–4 on penalties.

Semi-finals

Final

References

External links
Rec.Sport.Soccer Statistics Foundation New Zealand 1992 page
UltimateNZSoccer website 1992 Chatham Cup page

Chatham Cup
Chatham Cup
Chatham Cup
Chat